Tom Richards (born 10 July 1986 in Guildford) is a retired Professional Squash player on the PSA World Tour who represented England. He reached a career-high World ranking of No. 12, where he remained for just under a year. He won a total of 6 PSA Titles. At the age of 25, Richards was a member of the England Elite squad and a full England International, winning the European Team Championships in 2012, 2016 and 2019. 

Richards was part of the England Squash set-up since the age of 9 having started playing at the age of 3. He was the Under 12 and Under 13 British National Champion and an Under 15, 17 and 19 European Champion with the England Team. He took the decision to turn professional at the age of 18 in November 2004 and in 2005 he won his first PSA title becoming the Kenya Open Champion.

Richards suffered a series of serious injuries throughout his career, including an ACL tear within the early years of his Professional career and a major Hamstring Tear in the 2012/13 season. After ACL reconstruction surgery Richards climbed to his highest ranking of 12 in the World in the 2012/13 season before suffering a 100% hamstring tear at the Grasshopper Cup in Zurich, slipping on sweat. Choosing rehabilitation instead of surgery, the following 18 months were a gruelling mixture of injury, rehabilitation and set back. After 17 years of competing globally Richards retired, aged 35.

References

External links 

 
 

1986 births
Living people
English male squash players
People from Walton-on-Thames
Competitors at the 2013 World Games